Oréade (Q164)''' was a French Navy  commissioned in 1933. During World War II, she operated on the Allied side until 1940, when she became part of the naval forces of Vichy France. She was sunk in November 1942.

Construction and commissioning
Construction of Oréade began on 18 December 1928, and her keel was  laid down at Ateliers et Chantiers de la Seine-Maritime in Le Trait, France, on 15 August 1929. She was launched on 23 May 1932. After fitting out, she was commissioned for trials on 15 August 1932. Her official trials began on 2 December 1932, and her final equipping and armament took place at Cherbourg, France, from 1 October to 10 November 1933. She was placed in full commission on 15 December 1933.

Service history
Pre-World War II

On 28 November 1934, the submarine  got underway from Cherbourg to conduct exercises with Oréade and Oréade′s sister ship .

World War II
French Navy
France entered the war on the side of the Allies on 3 September 1939. Oréade subsequently patrolled in the Atlantic Ocean in the vicinity of the Canary Islands. She underwent a refit at Oran in December 1939.

German ground forces advanced into France on 10 May 1940, beginning the Battle of France, and Italy declared war on France on 10 June 1940 and joined the invasion. The Battle of France ended in France's defeat and an armistice with Germany and Italy on 22 June 1940. When the armistice when into effect on 25 June 1940, Oréade still was based at Oran.

Vichy France

After France′s surrender, Oréade served in the naval forces of Vichy France. In the succeeding months she spent time at Bizerte in Tunisia in August 1940; Toulon, France, in October 1940; Casablanca in French Morocco in December 1940; and Dakar in Senegal in February 1941. During July 1941, she visited first Agadir and then Casablanca in French Morocco.

In January 1942 Oréade conducted defensive patrols off ports in French Morocco, and during the month she spent 7 to 19 January at Safi, French Morocco, with La Psyché. The two submarines visited Port Lyautey, French Morocco, from 13 to 17 February 1942.Oréade was disarmed at Casablanca in March 1942 in accordance with the terms of the 1940 armistice. She returned to active service in September 1942. Still part of the 18th Submarine Division, she got underway from Oran on 30 October 1942 bound for Casablanca.

Loss
When Operation Torch, the Allied invasion of French North Africa, began on the morning of 8 November 1942, Oréade was moored at Casablanca. The Naval Battle of Casablanca began that morning, and bomb-armed United States Navy TBF Avenger torpedo bombers from the aircraft carrier  and the escort carrier  attacked the harbor at 07:10. After taking bomb damage, Oréade capsized and sank, suffering four dead and six wounded. Her commanding officer was among the wounded, and he died of his wounds later in the day, raising Oréades death toll to five.Oréade'' was refloated on 10 June 1943 and placed in "special reserve" on 29 September 1943 at Casablanca. She was condemned on 26 March 1946.

References

Citations

Bibliography
 .

External links

 .
 .
 .
 .
 .
 .
 .

Diane-class submarine (1930)
1932 ships
Ships built in France
World War II submarines of France
Maritime incidents in November 1942
Submarines sunk by aircraft
World War II shipwrecks in the Atlantic Ocean
Lost submarines of France